Highway 100 (AR 100, Ark. 100, and Hwy. 100) is a designation for two state highways in Central Arkansas.



Description
One route of  begins at Highway 365 and runs southeast through Maumelle to Interstate 40 (I-40). This route was designated in 1987 and is maintained by the Arkansas Department of Transportation (ArDOT).

History

The Highway 100 designation was created at the request of the mayor of North Little Rock, who planned to construct Riverside Drive between Rose City and Locust Street, and desired inclusion in the state highway system. The Arkansas State Highway Commission agreed to an alignment in 1965, but the road was not completed for over 20 years. The designation was officially assigned on December 1, 1987, following completion of Riverside Drive between I-30 and Pike Avenue. The highway was extended east to US 70 on May 13, 1998.

A second segment was created on May 6, 1987 along Maumelle Boulevard in response to the population growth of Maumelle. The route was extended along Crystal Hill Road to I-40 on August 11, 1993, at the request of concerned citizens, members of the Arkansas General Assembly, and the Pulaski County Judge. The extension was in exchange for removing a segment of Highway 176 near Camp Joseph T. Robinson.

Major intersections

Former route 

Another section of AR 100 previously existed in North Little Rock, and was known locally as "Riverfront Drive". It was initially signed in 1987, and was decommissioned in 2019.

See also

References

External links

100
Transportation in Pulaski County, Arkansas
North Little Rock, Arkansas